Robert R. Stafsholt is an American politician. A Republican, he has been a member of the Wisconsin State Senate for the 10th district since 2021. He was previously a member of the Wisconsin State Assembly from the 29th assembly district for two terms.

Early life, education, and career before politics
Stafsholt graduated from New Richmond High School in 1994. He attended the University of Wisconsin–Eau Claire and University of Wisconsin–River Falls.

Stafsholt comes from a farming family, and managed the family farm; he previously ran his family's food manufacturing business, worked as a mortgage loan originator, and owned several rental units.

Political career
In 2016, after incumbent Wisconsin State Assembly Representative John Murtha declared that he would not seek re-election to a sixth term, Stafsholt filed to run for the 29th district seat.  Stafsholt won the Republican primary, and defeated Democrat Scottie Ard in the 2016 general election. He was re-elected in 2018. In 2020, Stafsholt ran for Wisconsin State Senate from the 10th Senate district, defeating Cherlie Link of Somerset in the Republican primary and incumbent Democratic state senator Patty Schachtner in the general election.

In the state Assembly, Stafsholt sponsored legislation to eliminate state protections for wetlands and air quality and to prohibit state and local government from using the power of eminent domain to create or extend bike trails, recreational trails, and sidewalks. Stafsholt authored legislation in 2019 that eliminated Wisconsin's minimum hunting age. In 2021, Stafsholt and other Republican state legislators demanded that the Wisconsin Department of Natural Resources implement immediately a wolf hunt season before the wolf could potentially be re-added to the federal Endangered Species List.

During his 2020 campaign for state Senate, Stafsholt criticized public-health orders issued by Governor Tony Evers to prevent the spread of COVID-19 during the pandemic, calling the orders "unlawful government overreach." In 2021, Stafsholt proposed legislation to prevent the University of Wisconsin System and Wisconsin Technical College System from requiring on-campus students to be vaccinated or regularly tested against COVID-19 in order to access campus buildings.

He is a member of the American Farm Bureau Federation, the National Rifle Association, the U.S. Sportsmen's Alliance, and Safari Club International; he is a former member of the Wisconsin Bear Hunters' Association and the Wisconsin Association of Mortgage Brokers.

Electoral history

Wisconsin Assembly (2016, 2018)

| colspan="6" style="text-align:center;background-color: #e9e9e9;"| Republican Primary, August 9, 2016

| colspan="6" style="text-align:center;background-color: #e9e9e9;"| General Election, November 8, 2016

| colspan="6" style="text-align:center;background-color: #e9e9e9;"| General Election, November 6, 2018

Wisconsin Senate (2020)

| colspan="6" style="text-align:center;background-color: #e9e9e9;"| Republican Primary, August 11, 2020

| colspan="6" style="text-align:center;background-color: #e9e9e9;"| General Election, November 3, 2020

References

External links
 
 
 Senator Rob Stafsholt at Wisconsin Legislature
 Official website
 Official website (Assembly - Archived December 2, 2020) 
 Campaign website (2020)
 29th Assembly District map (2011–2021)
 10th Senate District map (2011–2021)

21st-century American politicians
Businesspeople from Wisconsin
Farmers from Wisconsin
Living people
Republican Party members of the Wisconsin State Assembly
People from New Richmond, Wisconsin
People from St. Croix County, Wisconsin
Republican Party Wisconsin state senators
Year of birth missing (living people)